Heterojinus semilaetanus is a species of beetle in the family Laemophloeidae, the only species in the genus Heterojinus.

References

Laemophloeidae
Cucujoidea genera